Ascandra densa is a species of calcareous sponge from Australia. The species name is derived from a Latin term meaning "dense" or "compact".

References 

 World Register of Marine Species entry

densa
Sponges described in 1872
Sponges of Australia